Neoscutopterus is a genus of beetles in the family Dytiscidae, containing the following species:

 Neoscutopterus angustus (LeConte, 1850)
 Neoscutopterus hornii (Crotch, 1873)

References

Dytiscidae